Antoni Władysław Jakubski (1885–1962) was a Polish zoologist and explorer.

Jakubski was born in Lemberg (Lwów), Galicia, Austria-Hungary (now Lviv, Ukraine) on 28 March 1885. He studied zoology from Prof. Józef Nusbaum-Hilarowicz at the Lwów University where he received a habilitation in 1917. In 1909-1910, he traveled to East Africa, becoming, on 13 March 1910, the first Pole to climb Mount Kilimanjaro. He crossed Tanganyika on foot, traveling from the Indian Ocean to the lakes Nyasa and Rukwa in order to study their fauna.

During the First World War, Jakubski fought in the Polish Legions. For his military service, he was awarded with a fifth class Virtuti Militari order and a Cross of the Valiant. From 1919 to 1939, he worked at the Poznań University. In 1923, he set up the Maritime Fishing Laboratory at Hel on the Baltic Sea. After the Second World War, during which he was an inmate of Nazi concentration camps, Jakubski settled in the United Kingdom where he was employed in the British Museum. He died in London on 20 May 1962.

Jakubski's area of research comprised faunistics, zoogeography, comparative anatomy and history of zoology. His works include: 
 W krainach słońca ["In the lands of the sun"], 1914 – an account of his African journey
 Czerwiec polski ["Polish cochineal"], 1934 – a monograph on the Polish cochineal
 Bibliografia fauny polskiej do roku 1880 ["Bibliography of Polish fauna until 1880"] (with M. Dyrdowska), 1928

References

1885 births
1962 deaths
Scientists from Lviv
20th-century Polish zoologists
Polish entomologists
Polish explorers
Explorers of Africa
Polish people of World War I
Polish people of World War II
Nazi concentration camp survivors
Employees of the British Museum
Polish emigrants to the United Kingdom
Explorers from the Russian Empire